Rajiv Kumar (born 6 July 1951) is an Indian economist who had served as the second vice-chairman of the NITI Aayog. He also serves as the chancellor of Gokhale Institute of Politics and Economics, Pune His earlier stint in government was initially with the Ministry of Industry and subsequently in the Ministry of Finance, as economic advisor during the reform years of 1991-1994. He has wide experience of having worked in government, academia, industry associations, as well as in international financial institutions. He also served as an independent director on the central boards of the Reserve Bank of India and the State Bank of India.

Kumar is the writer of several books on India's economy and national security. He is an economic columnist for major Indian publications and is a speaker on the Indian political economy.

Early life and education 
He has a bachelor's degree from St. Stephen college, Delhi University. Kumar holds a Ph.D from the Lucknow University, which he received in 1978 and another Ph.D. in economics from Oxford University, which he received in 1981.

Career 

Kumar was appointed senior research program officer, Indian Council for Research on International Economic Relations (ICRIER) in Delhi in 1982. 

He was a professor in Indian Institute of Foreign Trade (IIFT) from 1987 to 1989.

He was then appointed as the Senior Consultant, Bureau of Costs and Prices at the Ministry of Industry, Government of India from 1989 to 1991. He served as the Economic Advisor in the Department of Economic Affairs, Ministry of Finance, Government of India, from 1992 to 1995. 

In 1995, he joined the Asian Development Bank in Manila, Philippines as a Principal Economist, where he served until 2005. 

He was the Chief Economist for Confederation of India Industries for 2 years from 2004 – 2006.  

He returned to ICRIER as the director and Chief Executive in Feb 2006 and continued to be until August 2010. 

He was the Secretary General at the FICCI from 2010 to 2012. 

He became a senior fellow at the Centre for Policy Research, Delhi from 2013 until January 2017. 

In 2017, he was appointed as the vice chairman of NITI Aayog -Government of India's apex think tank, with the rank of a Cabinet Minister. He was also the chairman of the Atal Innovation Mission with its mandate to establish an innovative eco-system in the country. He served in NITI Aayog until 2022. 

He also served as an independent director on the Central Boards of the Reserve Bank of India and the State Bank of India.

He is the founding director and Chairman of Pahle India Foundation - a public policy think tank facilitating policy change in India based in New Delhi.

Bibliography

References

External links
 

Indian economists
St. Stephen's College, Delhi alumni
Alumni of the University of Oxford
University of Lucknow alumni
20th-century Indian economists
21st-century Indian economists
1951 births
Living people
Delhi University alumni